Francis Ramsay may refer to:

 Francis Dennis Ramsay (1925–2009), Scottish portrait painter
 Francis Munroe Ramsay (1835–1914), U.S. Navy officer
 Francis Ramsay (cricketer) (1860–1947), English cricketer and pastoralist in Queensland